Simeon Galeţchi (born Semjén Gáliczki; February 15, 1887 in Donduşeni) was a Bessarabian politician.

Biography
He served as Member of the Moldovan Parliament (1917–1918).

Gallery

Bibliography
Gheorghe E. Cojocaru, Sfatul Țării: itinerar, Civitas, Chişinău, 1998, 
Mihai Taşcă, Sfatul Țării şi actualele autorităţi locale, "Timpul de dimineaţă", no. 114 (849), June 27, 2008 (page 16)
Alexandru Chiriac. Membrii Sfatului Ţării. 1917–1918. Dicţionar, Editura Fundaţiei Culturale Române, București, 2001.

External links
 Preţul plătit pentu Unire
 Arhiva pentru Sfatul Tarii
 Deputaţii Sfatului Ţării şi Lavrenti Beria

References

1887 births
People from Dondușeni District
Moldovan MPs 1917–1918
Year of death missing